Patricia S. Curley (born October 25, 1946) is an American lawyer and retired judge.  She served on the Wisconsin Court of Appeals in the Milwaukee-based District I from 1996 until her retirement in 2016, and served as its presiding judge from 2007.  Prior to her election to the Court of Appeals, she served 18 years as a Wisconsin circuit court judge in Milwaukee County.

Biography
Born in Milwaukee, Curley is the daughter of Judge Robert M. Curley, a legislator and Wisconsin Circuit Court judge.  She received her bachelor's degree from Marquette University in 1969 and graduated from Marquette University Law School in 1973.  From 1973 to 1978, Curley was employed as an assistant district attorney in Milwaukee County, serving in the office's sensitive crimes unit under District Attorney E. Michael McCann.

In July 1978, Curley was appointed to the Milwaukee County Circuit Court by Governor Martin J. Schreiber; she was elected to a six-year term on the court in April 1979 and subsequently re-elected in 1985 and 1991.  During her tenure on the circuit court, Curley specialized in family law and served ten years as a family court judge.

In 1996, Judge Curley challenged incumbent Wisconsin Court of Appeals Judge Michael T. Sullivan. After a contentious campaign, Curley defeated Judge Sullivan.  Judge Curley went on to win re-election in 2002 and 2008.  In 2007, Curley succeeded Judge Ted E. Wedemeyer, Jr., as presiding judge of District I.

Electoral history

Wisconsin Circuit Court (1979, 1985, 1991)

Wisconsin Court of Appeals (1996, 2002, 2008, 2014)

| colspan="6" style="text-align:center;background-color: #e9e9e9;"| Primary Election, February 6, 1996

| colspan="6" style="text-align:center;background-color: #e9e9e9;"| General Election, March 19, 1996

References

1946 births
Living people
Lawyers from Milwaukee
Marquette University Law School alumni
Wisconsin Court of Appeals judges
Wisconsin state court judges
Wisconsin lawyers
20th-century American judges
21st-century American judges
20th-century American women judges
21st-century American women judges